Victor Amaya (born July 2, 1954) is a retired tennis player from the U.S.

The left-handed Amaya's career-high singles ranking was World No. 15, attained in August 1980.

One of Amaya's memorable matches was a loss to Björn Borg in the first round of the 1978 Wimbledon Championships.  With his 135 mph serve, he led Borg two sets to one, then lost 9–8, 1–6, 6–1, 3–6, 3–6.

Amaya also won the 1980 French Open doubles title with partner Hank Pfister.

Amaya played college tennis at the University of Michigan.

Career finals

Singles (3 titles, 5 runner-ups)

Doubles (6 titles, 7 runner-ups)

References

External links 
 
 

1954 births
Living people
American male tennis players
French Open champions
Grand Slam (tennis) champions in men's doubles
Michigan Wolverines men's tennis players
Sportspeople from Denver
Sportspeople from Grand Rapids, Michigan
Tennis people from Colorado
Tennis people from Michigan
20th-century American people